Emigration Canyon is a metro township and canyon in Salt Lake County, Utah, United States, located east of Salt Lake City in the Wasatch Range. Beginning at the southern end of the University of Utah, the canyon itself heads east and northeast between Salt Lake City and Morgan County. The boundaries of the metro township do not extend to the county line, nor do they encompass all of Emigration Canyon, as parts of it are within Salt Lake City. As of the 2010 census, the population was 1,568.

A portion of Emigration Canyon, located in This Is the Place Heritage Park, was declared a National Historic Landmark in 1961 for the canyon's significance in the Mormon migration of the 19th century.

Demographics

History
Emigration Canyon was significant in early Utah history as the original route used by pioneers entering the area.  It was part of the Hastings Cutoff route used by the Donner Party in 1846 and where the Mormon Pioneers entered the Salt Lake Valley in 1847. As Brigham Young looked over the canyon, he declared, "This is the right place. Drive on." These words have become famous in Utah history. The event is commemorated with This Is The Place Heritage Park at the mouth of the canyon. Throughout Emigration Canyon, there are several historic markers designating camps, trail markers, and milestones where the Mormon Pioneers passed while on their way to the Salt Lake Valley. One example of these milestones is called Lost Creek Camp.

The township of Emigration Canyon was formed on January 8, 1997.

In 2015, the township's residents voted to incorporate and become a metro township.

Local attractions
Hogle Zoo, the main zoo in the Salt Lake City area, also lies at the mouth of the canyon but is within Salt Lake City limits.  Emigration Canyon is home to Camp Kostopulos, established in 1967 by the Kostopulos Dream Foundation as a summer camp for disabled children, teens, and adults. It is adjacent to the historic Ruth's Diner, established in 1930.

Cycling 
Emigration Canyon is one of the most accessible canyon rides from Salt Lake City. With a length of 7.7 miles and an average grade of 5 percent, there are approximately 1,300 feet of elevation gain from the mouth to the top, which cyclists often refer to as "Little Mountain".  There is a good shoulder to ride in, and locals are used to bicycling traffic. There are restrooms located at the bottom of the canyon and the top, but these may be closed during the winter months.

Proposed development
Much of Emigration Canyon is protected within the Uinta-Wasatch-Cache National Forest.

See also

 List of census-designated places in Utah
 Mormon Trail
 List of National Historic Landmarks in Utah
 National Register of Historic Places listings in Salt Lake County, Utah

References

External links

 Emigration Canyon Metro Township Online
 Emigration Canyon Trails Master Plan
 Utah.com

Canyons and gorges of Utah
Central Overland Route
Mormon Trail
Donner Party
National Historic Landmarks in Utah
Salt Lake City metropolitan area
Townships in Salt Lake County, Utah
Census-designated places in Utah
Census-designated places in Salt Lake County, Utah
Canyons and gorges of Salt Lake County, Utah
Natural features on the National Register of Historic Places in Utah
National Register of Historic Places in Salt Lake County, Utah
Townships in Utah